Shreya Ghoshal (born 12 March 1984) is an Indian playback singer. She has received four National Film Awards, six Filmfare Awards including five for Best Female Playback Singer, nine Filmfare Awards South for Best Female Playback Singer (four for Malayalam, two for Tamil, two for Kannada, and one for Telugu), Four Kerala State Film Awards and two Tamil Nadu State Film Awards. She has recorded songs for film music and albums in various Indian languages and has established herself as a leading playback singer of Indian cinema.

Filmography

Special appearances

See also
 List of songs recorded by Shreya Ghoshal

References

Shreya Ghoshal
Indian filmographies